Leonel Vasco Oliveira Pegado (born 26 January 1931), simply known as Pegado, is a Portuguese retired footballer who played as a half-back.

Career
Born in Mozambique, Pegado joined Benfica in 1954 and made his debut on 13 February 1955, against CUF. He faced strong competition from Alfredo Abrantes, Francisco Palmeiro and Mário Coluna, so that game was his sole appearance in a league-winning campaign of 1954–55.

After another season in the background; in 1956–57 he assumed a starting role alongside Serra and Alfredo Abrantes, playing 27 matches and scoring five times, winning his second league title. Pegado remained an important player in the following year, making 24 appearances in all competitions, in what was his last season at Benfica.

Honours
Benfica
Primeira Liga:1954–55, 1956–57

References
General
 

Specific

External links

1931 births
Living people
Mozambican footballers
Mozambican expatriate footballers
Portuguese footballers
Association football midfielders
Primeira Liga players
S.L. Benfica footballers